The Çoban Yıldızı power stations are 2 coal-fired power stations in Turkey in Konya province owned by Konya Sugar which is in turn owned by Anadolu Birlik Holding.

References

External links 

 Çoban Yıldızı power stations on Global Energy Monitor
 Çoban Yıldız power station on Global Energy Monitor

Coal-fired power stations in Turkey